The Ground Wave Emergency Network (GWEN) was a command and control communications system intended for use by the United States government to facilitate military communications before, during and after a nuclear war. Specifically, the GWEN network was intended to survive the effects of an electromagnetic pulse from a high-altitude nuclear explosion and ensure that the United States President or their survivors could issue a launch order to Strategic Air Command bombers by radio.

AN/URC-117 was the system's Joint Electronics Type Designation System identifier, which signified various radio components installed in different locations. Of 240 planned GWEN towers, only 58 were built. In 1994, a defense appropriations bill banned the funding of new GWEN tower construction, and a few months later, the GWEN program was cancelled by the US Air Force. The United States Coast Guard later outfitted a number of former GWEN sites to house the Nationwide Differential GPS system.

History
GWEN was part of the Strategic Modernization Program designed to upgrade the nation's strategic communication system, thereby strengthening the value of nuclear deterrence. The GWEN communication system, established in the late 1980s, was designed to transmit critical Emergency Action Messages (EAM) to United States nuclear forces. EMP can produce a sudden power surge over a widespread area that could overload unprotected electronic equipment and render it inoperable. In addition, EMP could interfere with radio transmissions that use the ionosphere for propagation. It was thought that GWEN would use a ground-hugging wave for propagation and so be unaffected by the EMP. The network was conceived as an array of approximately 240 radio transceivers distributed across the continental USA which operated in the Low frequency (LF) radio band.

Analysis showed that low-frequency (150-190 kilohertz) radio transmissions were largely unaffected by high-altitude EMP, and the Air Force Weapons Laboratory (Kirtland Air Force Base) tested a small scale 'groundwave' transmission system in 1978-1982. Based on the groundwave concept's promise, USAF Headquarters issued a draft Program Management Directive (PMD) for a "Proliferated Groundwave Communications System (PGCS)" on 25 August 1981. The name of this proposed network system was changed from PGCS to Groundwave Emergency Network in February 1982 The Air Force placed a tentative initial operating capability for GWEN by January 1992.

When doubts arose regarding the threat of electromagnetic pulse to permanently shut down communications, only 58 of the originally planned 240 GWEN towers were built. In 1994 a defense appropriations bill banned new towers from being built, and shortly after, the GWEN program was cancelled by the Air Force.

Operations
Command and control messages originating at various military installations were transmitted on the 225 to 400 MHz band and received by a network of unmanned relay stations, called "Relay Nodes", dispersed throughout the contiguous 48 states. The Relay Nodes would re-transmit these command and control messages to each other, and to Strategic Air Command operating locations and launch control centers using low frequencies in the 150-175 kHz range in order to take advantage of ground-hugging radio propagation similar to commercial AM radio stations.

Distance between the Relay Nodes were approximately 150–200 miles, determined by the ground wave transmission range. During initial operations, the Relay Nodes would receive and relay brief test messages every 20 minutes. The system had built-in redundancy, using packet switching techniques for reconstruction of connectivity if system damage occurred.

Problems
Early in its lifetime, electrical interference problems caused by GWEN system operation began to surface. Since the stations were using LF, the chosen frequency was within 1 kHz of the operating frequency of nearby electrical carrier current systems. With GWEN handling constant voice, teletype and other data traffic, it caused interference to the power companies diagnostic two kilohertz side carrier tone. When the side carrier tone disappeared due to interference from GWEN, the power grid would interpret that as a system fault.

Site layout
It was surrounded on the perimeter by locked,  chain-link fences topped with barbed wire. Typical site features included:

A radial network of underground wires forming a large ground plane to serve as a reflecting surface for radio waves
Three electronic equipment shelters; two located near the perimeter of the site, and one at the base of the tower containing an antenna-tuning unit (ATU)
UHF and LF receive antennas mounted on either a 10 ft. mast, 30 ft. light pole, or 60–150 ft. tower.
A diesel backup generator, with a two-chambered fuel tank having a capacity of 

The main GWEN antenna operated intermittently in the LF band at 150 to 175 kilohertz (kHz) (below the bottom of the AM broadcast band at 530 kHz). The peak broadcasting power was from 2,000 to 3,000 watts. The UHF antenna operated at 20 watts, between 225 and 400 megahertz (MHz).

GWEN site locations
A 1998 U.S. Department of Transportation environmental impact survey that proposed repurposing a number of existing GWEN sites for use by the Nationwide Differential Global Positioning System listed the locations of 29 GWEN sites:

Appleton, Washington
Austin, Nevada
Bakersfield, California
Billings, Montana
Bobo, Mississippi
Clark, South Dakota
Edinburg, North Dakota
Fenner, California
Flagstaff, Arizona
Gettysburg, Pennsylvania
Goodland, Kansas
Grady, Alabama
Great Falls, Montana
Hackleburg, Alabama
Hagerstown, Maryland
Hawk Run, Pennsylvania
Kirtland AFB, New Mexico
Klamath Falls, Oregon
Macon, Georgia
Medford, Wisconsin
Medora, North Dakota
Onondaga, Michigan
Penobscot, Maine
Pueblo, Colorado
Ronan, Montana
Savannah Beach, Georgia
Spokane, Washington
Summerfield, Texas
Whitney, Nebraska

Termination
Some of the initial towers had prompted groups of citizens in Massachusetts, Oregon, Pennsylvania, and California to organize to fight construction of GWEN towers in their areas. The groups believed that the presence of a GWEN node would increase the community's "strategic worth" in the eyes of the Soviet Union and thus invite attack. Responding to these groups, the Air Force repeatedly downplayed the importance of the towers, stating they were not worth that kind of attention by the Soviet Union.

Amid controversy and world geopolitical changes, GWEN's value diminished greatly in the post-Cold War environment, in addition to its existence being rendered moot by the sustained effectiveness of predecessor and follow-on systems (Survivable Low Frequency Communication System and Minimum Essential Emergency Communication Network respectively).  As early as 1990, legislative measures were enacted to terminate the program.

In 1994, new construction of GWEN towers were banned after a defense appropriations bill eliminated any funding for the towers for one year. A few months later, the United States Air Force announced that they would terminate the construction contract to build the remaining 25 towers, except for monies used to dismantle the system.

Gallery

See also
Command and Control (military)
Differential Global Positioning System
Post Attack Command and Control System (PACCS)
Minimum Essential Emergency Communications Network (MEECN)
Emergency Rocket Communications System (ERCS)
Survivable Low Frequency Communications System (SLFCS)

References

General
 Closure of the Ground Wave Emergency Network (GWEN) Relay Nodes, USAF EAIP 1998.

External links
 FAS: Federation of American Scientists
 USAF Installations

Military communications
United States nuclear command and control
Nuclear warfare
1992 establishments in the United States